Susan Rutherford McCouch (born 1953) is an American geneticist specializing in the genetics of rice. She is the Barbara McClintock Professor of Plant Breeding and Genetics at Cornell University, and since 2018 a member of the National Academy of Sciences. In 2012, she was awarded the Chancellor's Award for Excellence in Scholarship and Creative Activities.

Education 
McCouch completed her Bachelor of Arts degree in Hispanic Studies at Smith College in 1975. She went on to receive her Master of Science degree in plant pathology from the University of Massachusetts in 1982. McCouch completed her PhD at Cornell University in 1990, where her research was supervised by Steven D. Tanksley.

Career 
After receiving her PhD, McCouch worked with the International Rice Research Institute in the Philippines until 1995. She then joined the Cornell faculty in the departments of plant breeding and genetics, plant biology, biological statistics, and computational biology. 
Her research interests are in plant genetics, rice, evolution, plant genomics and population biology.
Her research has identified the genetic mechanisms used by rice to survive long-term flooding, and the development of a new cultivar of red rice.

Awards and honors 

She was awarded the  Chancellor's Award for Excellence in Scholarship and Creative Activities (2012) and elected a member of the National Academy of Sciences (NAS) in 2018.

References 

1953 births
Living people
American geneticists
Cornell University alumni
Cornell University faculty
Members of the United States National Academy of Sciences